This is a comprehensive list of Headmasters of the Royal Grammar School, Guildford since 1554. There have been 35 headmasters since the granting of the Royal Charter, which established the post of headmaster:

1554 - 1555 ? Lawson
1555 - 1556 Thomas Baker
1556 - 1569 Thomas Jervard
1569 - 1575 Roger Goad
1575 - 1580 Francis Taylor
1580 - c.1584 John Stanford
c.1584 - 1589 Thomas Parvish
1589 - 1594 John Good
1594 - 1603 John Crow
1603 - 1623 James Bladworth
1623 - 1633 William Hill
1633 - 1645 George Holmes
1645 - 1698 John Graille
1698 - 1718 Samuel Pigot
1718 - 1722 John Randal
1722 - 1733 George Stevens
1733 - 1756 Cornelius Jeale
1756 - 1769 John Pearsall

1769 - 1804 Samuel Cole
1804 - 1819 William Hodgson Cole
1819 - 1822 John Stedman
1822 - 1837 Henry Ayling
1837 - 1852 Joseph Belin
1852 - 1859 Frederick James Fairhead
1859 - 1874 Henry Gordon Merriman
1874 - 1879 Charles Henry Jeaffreson
1879 Edward J. Piggott (temporary appointment)
1879 - 1889 Sidney Bolton Kincaid
1889 - 1919 John Charles Honeybourne
1919 - 1942 Arthur John Bradford Green
1942 - 1967 Michael Duncan Hallowes
1967 - 1975 Wilfred Harry Hore
1975 - 1992 John Daniel
1992 - 2007 Timothy Mark Stuart Young
2007–present Jonathan Mark Cox

See also
King Edward VI
List of Old Guildfordians (Royal Grammar School, Guildford)
Royal Grammar School, Guildford
Royal Charter

References 

Royal Grammar School, Guildford, Heads
Royal Grammar School, Guildford
Royal Grammar School, Guildford
Surrey-related lists